Joshua Liendo Edwards (born August 20, 2002) is a Canadian competitive swimmer who specializes in the freestyle and butterfly. He is the first Black Canadian swimmer to win an individual medal at a major international championship, as well as the first to win a gold medal, and represented Canada at the 2020 Summer Olympics.

Career

Early life 
Liendo was born in Scarborough, Ontario, but spent his early childhood in Trinidad and Tobago, beginning to learn to swim there. His family relocated to Markham when he was nine years old. He began club swimming with the Toronto Olympian Swim Team, before moving to the North York Aquatic Club. He would later cite Michael Phelps as his inspiration to focus on the butterfly discipline.

At the 2017 Canadian junior championships, Liendo set an age group record in the 100 m butterly, swimming it in 54.76 seconds, which he would later cite as the moment he knew he could go far in the sport. At the 2018 Junior Pan Pacific Swimming Championships, held in August in Suva, Fiji, he won a bronze medal in the 4100 metre medley relay, splitting a 53.65 for the butterfly leg of the relay to contribute to the final time of 3:21.32. Liendo was named to his first national team for the 2018 Summer Youth Olympics held in October in Buenos Aires, Argentina.

2019 season 
Liendo's first senior team was at the 2019 World Aquatics Championships, where he competed in the 4×100 men's medley relay. The team finished in tenth place and did not qualify for the finals.

Later in the year, Liendo won three medals at the 2019 FINA World Junior Swimming Championships in Budapest, and for that performance was named as Swimming Canada's junior male swimmer of the year. At a time when Swimming Canada was enjoying enormous success with its women's program while the men's program was struggling, Liendo was widely identified as perhaps the most promising emerging talent on the men's side.

2021 season 
As part of the 2021 Canadian Olympic swimming trials in Toronto, Liendo broke the national record in the 100 m butterfly event, with a time of 51.40. This qualified him for the 2020 Summer Olympics in Tokyo.

Liendo competed in three individual events in Tokyo (the 50 m and 100 m freestyle and the 100 m butterfly), but did not advance beyond the semi-finals in any of them. He was part of the Canadian team in the 4x100 m freestyle relay that unexpectedly qualified to the event final and the finished in fourth place, 0.60 seconds back of a bronze medal. He also swam the butterfly leg of the 4×100 m medley relay, where the Canadian team finished seventh.

Following the Olympics, Liendo competed at the FINA World Swimming Championships in Abu Dhabi. He won individual bronze medals in the 50 m and 100 m freestyle events, and was part of the gold medal-winning Canadian team in the 4×50 m mixed freestyle relay. Of the gold medal, he remarked "I wasn't expecting a gold medal going into it. To look at the board and see gold medal, world champion, looking back on that it was a crazy moment being on top of that board and hearing that anthem. It definitely made me want more."

2022 season
Liendo began the 2022 World Aquatics Championships as part of the Canadian team for the 4×100 m freestyle relay, where they finished in sixth place. He then qualified to an individual World Championship event final for the first time in the 100 m freestyle, ranking third in the semi-finals with another personal best time. In the event final, Liendo lead at the halfway mark, finishing third to take the bronze medal in a close contest, with only 0.07 seconds separating him and silver medalist Maxime Grousset of France. This was the first individual medal at the World Championships for a Canadian man since Ryan Cochrane's final bronze medal in 2015. On the day after his bronze medal, the championships' schedule called on Liendo to perform a "double-double," swimming in two heats in the morning session and two semi-finals in the evening session to qualify for the finals of both the 100 m butterfly and the 50 m freestyle. He was third among semi-finalists in both. The following day, Liendo competed in three finals in the evening session, finishing fifth in the 50 m freestyle before winning his second bronze medal in the 100 m butterfly. He then joined the Canadian team in the 4×100 m mixed freestyle relay, leading off the event and helping win a silver medal. He remarked "it was a fun night."

Named to Canada's team for the 2022 Commonwealth Games, Liendo began the first day of the championships by winning the bronze medal in the mixed 4×100 m freestyle relay, and qualifying to the event final of the 50 m butterfly by placing ninth in the heats and fourth in the semi-finals. The following day he placed sixth in the 50 m butterly final with a new personal best time of 23.42, and won a bronze with the men's team in the 4×100 m freestyle. This was the first men's relay medal for Canada at a major event since the 2015 Pan American Games, and the first at the Commonwealth Games since 2006. On the fourth day, Liendo finished seventh in the 100 m freestyle final, and qualified to the 100 m butterfly with the fourth-fastest time in the semi-finals. He noted that "the butterfly feels a lot better than freestyle right now." He went on to win gold in the 100 m butterfly final, his first individual gold at a major championship. On the final day of the swimming competitions, he won a bronze medal in the 50 m freestyle, his fourth medal of the Games. Liendo admitted afterward that  there’s been some ups and downs at these Games but I'm glad to finish it off like this against a great field."

References

External links
 
 

2002 births
Living people
Canadian male freestyle swimmers
Canadian male butterfly swimmers
Sportspeople from Markham, Ontario
Swimmers at the 2018 Summer Youth Olympics
Swimmers at the 2020 Summer Olympics
Olympic swimmers of Canada
Medalists at the FINA World Swimming Championships (25 m)
World Aquatics Championships medalists in swimming
Swimmers at the 2022 Commonwealth Games
Commonwealth Games medallists in swimming
Commonwealth Games gold medallists for Canada
Commonwealth Games bronze medallists for Canada
Medallists at the 2022 Commonwealth Games